The Troubled Troubador is a 7" EP by American punk rock musician GG Allin, on which Allin takes a deliberate excursion into country music.

EP sales, and Allin's death in 1993, spurred Brodian to compile the EP, along with its lone outtake and some other related material, into The Troubled Troubadour expanded CD edition in 1996.

History 
A longtime fan of Hank Williams Sr. to the point where he had long adapted a similar lifestyle, The Troubled Troubadors roots originated when Allin, while making some song demos, sat down and proceeded to improvise, on the spot, the song that became "When I Die". Overtly pleased with how well the song turned out, Allin refined the song and wrote down the lyrics to the final version, and recorded it, along with three other similar songs, on a four-track cassette machine with Allin singing and playing acoustic rhythm guitar while friend and collaborator Mark Sheehan played acoustic slide guitar.

With the songs completed, Allin and Sheehan did a quick mixdown of the recording, which Allin later put aside, feeling that at the time, no one would ever release it. Then came Allin's sudden arrest and extradition to Michigan on charges of felonious assault.

Mountain Records founder and president Stewart Brodian made contact with Allin in prison via Allin's Oak Lawn, Illinois post office box. Mountain Records usually recorded and released Brodian's own work, and Brodian was interested in working with Allin on something. The two factors spurred GG to suggest releasing a recording of his acoustic material on Mountain. Brodian, after hearing a tape of the sessions, immediately agreed.

Allin and Brodian began communicating regularly through both mail and via collect phone calls Allin would make from prison. Excited about the material, Brodian immediately arranged to have 1,500 copies of the EP pressed up. Brodian was only able to fit three songs onto the record, so the song "Kissing The Flames" was left out.

The first pressing of the EP consisted of 500 red vinyl records and 1,000 black vinyl. The entire red vinyl pressing, and the first 500 copies of the black vinyl version, featured a label that adapted some of Allin's line drawings and envelope art, as well as a hand-drawn version of the Mountain Records logo. The remaining 500 copies were pressed using a standard Mountain Records label. All but 25 copies of the red vinyl and 25 of the black vinyl were sold by December 1990, a sales figure that both amazed Allin (since he didn't think his fans would accept such a musical left turn from him) and made him very pleased, given his pride in how the recordings came out.

"When I Die" would be heard as the closing song on the GG Allin documentary Hated: GG Allin and the Murder Junkies.

"Sitting in This Room" is actually the second version of this early GG acoustic song. A demo version, recorded in the mid-80's, was released on the Doctrine of Mayhem compilation earlier in 1990. A third version of the song would be recorded by Allin during the sessions for his country album Carnival of Excess, and would be released in 2016 on the Uncool Unclean Unplugged compilation.

Track listing 
All songs written by GG Allin.
"When I Die" – 3:52
"Liquor Slicked Highway" – 2:55
"Sitting in This Room" – 2:53

Troubled Troubador (EP), The
GG Allin albums
Troubled Troubador (EP), The